The Aarschotse Stadsbrouwerij ("Aarschot city brewery"), located in the city of Aarschot, Belgium, is an initiative of the city's governing body in collaboration with local brewing-enthusiasts.

History and description
In 1989 the city decided to ensure that the Aarschotse Bruine, a typical Flemish Red-Brown beer of the wider Aarschot countryside, was being brewed again after the last local brewer ceased trading in 1969. Before that year many local brewers made the beer but take-overs and consolidation of the market caused them to cease brewing. In 2012 the city governors decided to support the initiative of the tourist board and make the barn of the culture centre Het Gasthuis available for conversion to a brewery.

The local beer- and wine-making guild Bier- en wijngilde ‘t Alternatief and De Aarschotse Bierwegers revived the taste, the brewing process and the production of the beer. Product development has successfully revived the Forto (blond) and Duc (dark) beers.

Visitors can follow the brewing process in the city brewery and taste the product in the  " 't Bruine Café" .

Products
Beers produced by the Aarschotse Stadsbrouwerij : 

 Aarschotse Bruine
 Aarschotse Duc
 Aarschotse Forto
 Gasthuis Tripel

References

Printed sources 
Alle Belgische Bieren, ed. Hilde Deweer, Stichting Kunstboek Oostkamp, 2015

External links
 Aarschot Tourist Board: Het Gasthuis website  
 Stadsbrouwerij Aarschot website
 Zythos Bierfestival website
 Lekker Hageland official local produce promotion board
 Ratebeer website: Aarschotse bruine
 Article in Het Nieuwsblad Aarschot heeft nieuwe Stadsbrouwerij en Aarschotse bruine
 BieresBelges website
 Belgenbier website
 Cervisia website

Breweries of Flanders